Ogbonna Emmanuel John (born 3 December 1997) is a Nigerian freestyle wrestler. He is a gold medalist at the African Games and a four-time gold medalist at the African Wrestling Championships. He is also a bronze medalist at the Commonwealth Games.

Career 

At the African Wrestling Championships he won the gold medal in his event four times: in 2017 and 2018 (in the weight class 70 kg) and in 2019 and 2020 (in the weight class 74 kg).

He was eliminated in his first match in both the 70 kg event at the 2017 World Wrestling Championships in Paris, France and in the 74 kg event at the 2019 World Wrestling Championships in Nur-Sultan, Kazakhstan. In 2019, he represented Nigeria at the African Games held in Rabat, Morocco and he won the gold medal in the men's freestyle 74 kg event.

In 2021, he won a gold medal at the Baraza Champion of Champions wrestling tournament held in Yenagoa, Bayelsa State, Nigeria. A few months later, he competed at the African & Oceania Olympic Qualification Tournament hoping to qualify for the 2020 Summer Olympics in Tokyo, Japan. He lost his first match against Amr Reda Hussen of Egypt which meant that he could no longer qualify for the Olympics at this tournament. He also failed to qualify for the Olympics at the World Olympic Qualification Tournament held in Sofia, Bulgaria.

He won one of the bronze medals in his event at the 2022 African Wrestling Championships held in El Jadida, Morocco. 
He won one of the bronze medals in the men's 74 kg event at the 2022 Commonwealth Games held in Birmingham, England.

Achievements

References

External links 
 

Living people
1997 births
Place of birth missing (living people)
Nigerian male sport wrestlers
African Games gold medalists for Nigeria
African Games medalists in wrestling
Competitors at the 2019 African Games
African Wrestling Championships medalists
Wrestlers at the 2022 Commonwealth Games
Commonwealth Games medallists in wrestling
Commonwealth Games bronze medallists for Nigeria
21st-century Nigerian people
Medallists at the 2022 Commonwealth Games